Wet-bulb potential temperature, sometimes referred to as pseudo wet-bulb potential temperature, is the temperature that a parcel of air at any level would have if, starting at the wet-bulb temperature, it were brought at the  saturated adiabatic lapse rate to the standard pressure of 1,000 mbar.

This temperature is conservative with respect to reversible adiabatic changes.

See also 
 Wet-bulb temperature
 Potential temperature
 Atmospheric thermodynamics
 Equivalent temperature
 Equivalent potential temperature

External links 
 AMS Glossary

 Oxford Index

Atmospheric thermodynamics